Saint Thomas Eastern is a parliamentary constituency represented in the House of Representatives of the Jamaican Parliament. It covers the eastern part of Saint Thomas Parish.

Fenton Ferguson was the MP but lost his seat in the 2020 general election to Michelle Charles.

Representatives 

 Pearnel Charles (1972 to 1980)
 Pearnel Charles (defeated by Ferguson in 1993)
 Fenton Ferguson (1993 to 2020)
 Michelle Charles (from 2020)

References

Parliamentary constituencies of Jamaica